Edward C. Waller may refer to:

 Edward Carson Waller (1845–1931), Chicago real estate developer
 Edward C. Waller III (born 1926), United States Navy admiral

See also
 Edward Waller (disambiguation)
 Edward Walker (disambiguation)